WOW Hits 2002 is a compilation album of 30 contemporary Christian music hits plus three bonus cuts from the year 2001.  It peaked at No. 52 on the Billboard 200 chart in 2001 and 2002, and also climbed to number two on the Top Contemporary Christian chart in both years. The album was certified as platinum in 2002 by the Recording Industry Association of America (RIAA).

Track listing

References

 Review at Amazon.com. Retrieved on 21 March 2007.

External links 
 WOW Hits online

2001 compilation albums
2002